Kelly da Silva Santos (born November 10, 1979) is a Brazilian professional women's basketball player .  and the Brazilian national basketball team.

Santos has played in the Women's National Basketball Association with the Detroit Shock and Seattle Storm.

References

1979 births
Living people
Basketball players at the 1999 Pan American Games
Basketball players at the 2000 Summer Olympics
Basketball players at the 2007 Pan American Games
Basketball players at the 2008 Summer Olympics
Basketball players at the 2015 Pan American Games
Basketball players at the 2016 Summer Olympics
Brazilian women's basketball players
Brazilian expatriate basketball people in Turkey
Brazilian expatriate basketball people in the United States
Basketball players from São Paulo
Centers (basketball)
Medalists at the 2000 Summer Olympics
Olympic basketball players of Brazil
Olympic bronze medalists for Brazil
Olympic medalists in basketball
Detroit Shock players
Seattle Storm players
Pan American Games medalists in basketball
Pan American Games silver medalists for Brazil
Pan American Games bronze medalists for Brazil
Medalists at the 2003 Pan American Games
Medalists at the 2007 Pan American Games